Joe Lydon may refer to:

Joe Lydon (rugby) (born 1963), English rugby league footballer and rugby union coach
Joe Lydon (boxer) (1878–1937), American welterweight boxer